The 1966 NCAA University Division baseball season, play of college baseball in the United States organized by the National Collegiate Athletic Association (NCAA) began in the spring of 1966.  The season progressed through the regular season and concluded with the 1965 College World Series.  The College World Series, held for the twentieth time in 1966, consisted of one team from each of eight geographical districts and was held in Omaha, Nebraska at Johnny Rosenblatt Stadium as a double-elimination tournament.  Ohio State claimed the championship.

Season headlines
 March 7 – Tulane's Stephen Martin became the first African American to play a varsity sport in the Southeastern Conference, debuting in the Green Wave's season opener against Spring Hill. In later years, Martin would be overlooked as an SEC integration pioneer because he was a walk-on and Tulane left the SEC immediately after the 1966 season.

Conference winners
This is a partial list of conference champions from the 1966 season.  Each of the eight geographical districts chose, by various methods, the team that would represent them in the NCAA Tournament.  11 teams earned automatic bids by winning their conference championship while 17 teams earned at-large selections.

Conference standings
The following is an incomplete list of conference standings:

College World Series

The 1966 season marked the twentieth NCAA Baseball Tournament, which culminated with the eight team College World Series.  The College World Series was held in Omaha, Nebraska.  The eight teams played a double-elimination format, with Ohio State claiming their first championship with an 8–2 win over Oklahoma State in the final.

Award winners

All-America team

References